Lake Killarney, also known as Petty Lake, is a shallow lake on New Providence Island in the Bahamas, and the largest on the island. Considered hidden from view, it is located just east of Lynden Pindling International Airport. It connects to the smaller Lake Nancy to its north through a canal made for canoeing.

Ecology
Lake Killarney is bounded by marshland and mangrove cays. Bird species such as Coots and ducks rest amongst the mangroves.

References

Killarney, Lake
Mangroves
New Providence